Lorraine Ugen (born 22 August 1991) is an English long jumper and occasional 100 m sprinter with respective personal bests of 7.05 m and 11.32 s. Ugen competed for Great Britain at the 2016 Olympics in Rio in the long jump, finishing in eleventh place.

Ugen captained the Great Britain team at the inaugural Athletics World Cup in 2018, winning gold in the women's long jump. For England, she anchored the women's 4 x 100 metres relay team to gold at the 2018 Commonwealth Games. As a collegiate athlete in the United States, she won an NCAA indoor and an NCAA outdoor title in the long jump for Texas Christian University.

Career
Ugen was born in London on 22 August 1991. As a child, she attended Townley Grammar School before going on to study at Christ the King Sixth Form College and then Brunel University London. She achieved national success at a young age, winning both the indoor and outdoor long jump titles at the 2009 English junior championships, as well as the English Schools' Athletics Championships. She was initially a member of Bexley Athletic Club, but later began training with Blackheath and Bromley Harriers Athletic Club. During the 2016 season, Lorraine joined the Thames Valley Harriers Athletic Club.  In her international debut, she competed in qualifying only at the 2009 European Athletics Junior Championships, then met the same fate at the 2010 World Junior Championships in Athletics. She was runner-up at the British Athletics Championships in 2011, but failed to register a mark at the 2011 European Athletics U23 Championships.

Ugen went on to study at Texas Christian University in 2011 and began competing for the college's TCU Horned Frogs athletic team the following year. She made her first appearance at the NCAA Indoor and NCAA Outdoor Championships in 2012, but did not record a valid mark at either event.

The mark ranked her in the top twenty in the world for the event that year. Internationally, she was a finalist at the 2013 European Athletics U23 Championships and represented Great Britain at the 2013 World Championships in Athletics, though she failed to record a valid mark.

She failed to defend her outdoor NCAA title, placing fourth with a mark under six and a half metres. Ugen competed for England for the first time at the 2014 Commonwealth Games where she placed fifth (5th). She has recently increased her personal best while soaring to great lengths at the European Indoor Championships in Belgrade during the 2017 season. With a new personal best of 6.97m, Ugen also gained a new British National Record and a silver medal.

She was selected to compete in the long jump for Team GB at the Tokyo 2020 Olympic Games.

Personal bests
Long jump (outdoor):  (2018)
Long jump (indoor): (2017)
100 metres: 11.32 seconds (2018)

International competitions

References

External links
 
 
 
 
 
 
 

1991 births
Living people
Athletes from London
British female long jumpers
English female long jumpers
British female sprinters
English female sprinters
Olympic female long jumpers
Olympic athletes of Great Britain
Athletes (track and field) at the 2016 Summer Olympics
Commonwealth Games gold medallists for England
Commonwealth Games gold medallists in athletics
Athletes (track and field) at the 2014 Commonwealth Games
Athletes (track and field) at the 2018 Commonwealth Games
World Athletics Championships athletes for Great Britain
British Athletics Championships winners
TCU Horned Frogs women's track and field athletes
Black British sportswomen
British people of Barbadian descent
Commonwealth Games competitors for England
Members of Thames Valley Harriers
Athletes (track and field) at the 2020 Summer Olympics
World Athletics Indoor Championships medalists
Medallists at the 2018 Commonwealth Games